Hougang MRT station is an underground Mass Rapid Transit (MRT) station on the North East line (NEL) in the Hougang planning area in Singapore. Located within the Hougang Town Centre, the station is directly connected to Hougang Central Bus Interchange and sits underneath that bus interchange.

Opened on 20 June 2003 as part of the NEL, this station will become an interchange station along the Cross Island line (CRL) when stage 1 opens in 2030.

History

Before the station opened, the Singapore Civil Defence Force conducted the second ever Shelter Open House on 15–16 February 2003, together with Chinatown, Farrer Park and Serangoon stations.

On 12 August 2005, train services were disrupted for hours as Liu Tze Yuen created a bomb threat at the station which turns out to be false. He was also accused of putting boxes in public buses on 7 July and 12 August – the latter on the same day he was accused of carrying out the hoax at Hougang. Liu allegedly intended the passengers on the two buses and the train station to believe that the packages contained explosive devices; he was later sentenced to 3 years in jail.

On 17 June 2015, train services between Farrer Park and Hougang station were delayed due to a track fault.

On 2 April 2017, an unattended bag caused a temporary shutdown of the station. At 2.55pm, SBS Transit announced that all trains will skip Hougang station due to a "security incident". Police subsequently confirmed the contents of the unattended bag were "non-dangerous". Train services resumed at 4.03pm after police gave the all-clear. A 39-year-old man was arrested for causing public nuisance after preliminary investigations show he intentionally left the bag inside the station while running an errand. The man, construction worker Wang Jianpo, was later fined S$1000 on 9 June for “causing annoyance to the public”. Deputy public prosecutor Daphne Lim said that his “grossly inconsiderate and thoughtless” act of leaving the blue suitcase unattended at the station platform while he ran an errand affected more than 4,000 commuters including 663 who were evacuated from the station.

On 27 February 2020, a power fault along the NEL resulted in service disruptions to the Punggol, Sengkang and Buangkok stations. At 5.36am, a shuttle train service was provided which operated on a single platform between the Punggol and Buangkok stations. In order to facilitate maintenance functions, the power source to the tracks between the Hougang and Punggol stations was switched off. Additionally, free regular and bridging bus services have been provided to serve these stations. The repair works were completed by 11.49am and usual service along the entire NEL resumed at 12.14pm. Investigations later revealed that a broken contact wire affected the power source to trains launching from Sengkang Depot, causing the service disruptions.

Details 
The station is located between Hougang Central and Hougang Avenue 10, between Kovan and Buangkok MRT stations. Its official station code is “NE14.”

Cross Island Line interchange

On 25 January 2019, LTA announced that Hougang station would be part of the proposed Cross Island Line (CRL). The station will be constructed as part of Phase 1, consisting of 12 stations between Aviation Park and Bright Hill, and is expected to be completed in 2030. Upon its opening, the station code will change to “NE14/CR8”.

On 26 March 2021, Contract CR112 for the design and construction of Hougang CRL Station and associated tunnels was awarded to Samsung C&T Corporation at a cost of S$604 million. The works include the new station and tunnels, as well as addition and alteration works to the existing station. Construction will start in the third quarter of 2021, with completion in 2030.

Initially expected to open in 2029, the restrictions on the construction due to the COVID-19 pandemic has led to delays in the CRL line completion, and the date was pushed to 2030.

Art In Transit 
The art-in-transit for the station, “Hands Up For Hougang”, by artist Seck Yok Ying, involves more than 3000 handprints of people of all walks of life, placed along the station.

References

External links

 Official website
 Hougang to Changi Airport by MRT

Railway stations in Singapore opened in 2003
Buildings and structures in Hougang
Mass Rapid Transit (Singapore) stations
Railway stations in North-East Region, Singapore